The Curse of Downers Grove is an American thriller film written by Bret Easton Ellis. Based on the 1999 novel Downers Grove by Michael Hornburg, the film stars Kevin Zegers, Bella Heathcote, Penelope Mitchell, Lucas Till, Zane Holtz, Helen Slater, and Tom Arnold. The film received a limited theatrical release on August 21, 2015 and a subsequent DVD/Blu-Ray release on September 1, 2015.

Plot
Set in Downers Grove, Illinois, a suburb of Chicago, the film is a teen angst thriller set in a high school gripped by an apparent curse that claims the life of a senior every year. The story follows the lives of two seniors: Chrissie, who is skeptical of the curse, and Tracy, who believes that she may be the next victim.

Cast

 Bella Heathcote as Chrissie
 Penelope Mitchell as Tracy
 Lucas Till as Bobby
 Zane Holtz as Guy
 Kevin Zegers as Chuck
 Mark L. Young as Ian
 Helen Slater as Chrissy's mother
 Tom Arnold as Chuck's father
 Jacqueline Emerson as Eyde
 Marcus Giamatti as Rich
 David Jason Perez as Jason
 Sherilyn Henderson as Monica Chase
 Joel Michael Kramer as Ryan
 Jeff Staron as Ezra
 Travis Nelson as Hunter
 Sean A. Rosales as Mike

Production

Filming
Principal photography began on March 10, 2013 and lasted for 25 days. Filming primarily took place throughout Pomona, California, including the historic Lincoln Park neighborhood. It is the first feature film to take advantage of an expansion of the studio zone resulting in the availability of Pomona.

Music
The film's music was composed by Matthew Margeson, who previously co-scored Kick-Ass 2 with Henry Jackman.

References

External links
 
 

2015 films
American teen horror films
2015 independent films
Films directed by Derick Martini
Films scored by Pinar Toprak
Films set in Illinois
Films shot in California
American independent films
Films based on American novels
2010s English-language films
2010s American films
Downers Grove, Illinois